Felimida fentoni is a dull coloured species of sea slug or dorid nudibranch, a marine gastropod mollusc in the family Chromodorididae.

Distribution 
This species was described from three specimens collected off Pinellas County, Florida, in the Gulf of Mexico, .

Description
Felimida fentoni has a translucent white background colour heavily flecked with dull red-brown and with small yellow spots with orange centres concentrated towards the edge of the mantle. There is a very thin orange-yellow submarginal line around the mantle.

Ecology
The specimens were collected feeding on the sponge Igernella notabilis.

References

Chromodorididae
Gastropods described in 2011